Willow Valley is an unincorporated community in Halbert Township, Martin County, in the U.S. state of Indiana.

History
A post office was established at Willow Valley in 1828, and remained in operation until it was discontinued in 1864. The community was named from the growth of willows in their valley.

Geography

References

Unincorporated communities in Martin County, Indiana
Unincorporated communities in Indiana